Elections to Southwark Council were held in May 1990.  The whole council was up for election. Turnout was 36.0%.

Election result

|}

Ward results

Abbey

Rita Sergeant was a sitting councillor for Chaucer ward

Alleyn

Percy Gray was a sitting councillor for College ward

Barset

Bellenden

Bricklayers

Browning

Patricia Matheson was a sitting councillor for Dockyard ward

Winston Stafford was a sitting councillor for St Giles ward

Brunswick

Burgess

Cathedral

Richard Shearman was a sitting councillor for Rotherhithe ward

Chaucer

College

Consort

David Fryer was a sitting councillor for Browning ward

Dockyard

Michael Geater was a sitting councillor for St Giles ward

Faraday

John Lauder was a sitting councillor for Brunswick ward

Friary

Ann Goss was a sitting councillor for Browning ward

Brian McKeon was a sitting councillor for Waverley ward

Liddle

Lyndhurst

John Edwards was a sitting councillor for Ruskin ward

Newington

Riverside

Rotherhithe

Ruskin

Rye

St Giles

The Lane

Waverley

Pamela Smith was a sitting councillor for The Lane ward

By-Elections

The by-election was called following the death of Cllr. John E. Maurice.

References

Council elections in the London Borough of Southwark
1990 London Borough council elections
20th century in the London Borough of Southwark